Jon Lewis may refer to:

Jon Lewis (cricketer, born 1970), English batsman for Durham and Essex
Jon Lewis (cricketer, born 1975), English bowler for Gloucestershire, Surrey, Sussex, and England
Jon Peter Lewis (born 1979), American singer and songwriter
J. S. Lewis (Jon Samuel Lewis), fiction writer
Jon Lewis, musician in Hyland
Jon Lewis, musician in The Dopamines
Jon Lewis (cartoonist), see Alternative Comics

See also
Jonathan Lewis (disambiguation)
John Lewis (disambiguation)